Ekaterina Zelenkova (born 28 February 1999) is a Russian female handballer for Rostov-Don and the Russian national team. 

She participated at the 2021 World Women's Handball Championship in Spain.

References

External links

1999 births
Living people
Sportspeople from Yaroslavl
Russian female handball players